Sri Ganganagar railway station is a main railway station in Sri Ganganagar District, Rajasthan. Its code is SGNR. It serves Sri Ganganagar city. The station consists of three platforms, neither of which is well sheltered Lots Of facilities including water and sanitation.

Major trains

Some of the important trains that runs from Shri Ganganagar are :

 22497/98 Shri Ganganagar–Tiruchirappalli Humsafar Express
 14711/12 Shri Ganganagar–Haridwar Intercity Express
 12481/82 Shri Ganganagar–Delhi Intercity Express
 12485/86 Shri Ganganagar–Hazur Sahib Nanded Express (via Abohar)
 17623/24 Shri Ganganagar–Hazur Sahib Nanded Weekly Express (via Ahmedabad)
 12439/40 Shri Ganganagar–Hazur Sahib Nanded Superfast Express (via Hanumangarh)
 14525/26 Shri Ganganagar–Ambala Cantonment Intercity Express
 14713/14 Shri Ganganagar–Jammu Tawi Express
 16311/12 Shri Ganganagar–Kochuveli Express
 22981/82 Shri Ganganagar–Kota Superfast Express
 22997/98 Shri Ganganagar–Jhalawar City Superfast Express
 13007/08 Shri Ganganagar–Howrah Udyan Abha Toofan Express
 19707/08 Shri Ganganagar–Bandra Terminus Amarapur Aravali Express

References

Railway stations in Sri Ganganagar district
Bikaner railway division
Transport in Sri Ganganagar